Following is a list of senators of Manche, people who have represented the department of Manche in the Senate of France.

Third Republic

Fourth Republic

Fifth Republic

References

 
Manche